Joseph Azar was a Jewish prince of the Anjuvannam in Cochin, South India. He was a descendant of Joseph Rabban. Azar lived in the 14th century CE.

In 1340 Joseph Azar became embroiled in a conflict over succession with his brother. The ensuing strife led to intervention by neighboring potentates and the eradication of Jewish autonomy in South India.

Resources

Blady, Ken. Jewish Communities in Exotic Places. Northvale, N.J.: Jason Aronson Inc., 2000. pp. 115–130.

See also
 Cochin Jews

External links
Jews of Cochin — Picture of Joseph Azar in the Paradesi Synagogue

14th-century Indian people
Cochin Jews
Mizrahi Jews
Indian Jews
Jewish royalty
History of Kerala